Rajesh Tripathi is an Indian politician and a member of 18th Legislative Assembly of Uttar Pradesh representing Chillupar. He is a member of the Bharatiya Janata Party, and had represented the Chillupar constituency as a member of the 15th and 16th Legislative Assembly of Uttar Pradesh.

Personal life
Tripathi was born to Shivakant Tripathi and hails from Chillupar in Gorakhpur district of Uttar Pradesh. He did his graduation from Deen Dayal Upadhyay Gorakhpur University in 1985.

Political career
Tripathi defeated strongman Harishankar Tiwari in 2007 in the Uttar Pradesh assembly election, and repeated it again in 2012, becoming a member of the 15th and 16th Legislative Assemblies from Chillupar. In the 2017 election, Tripathi lost to Vinay Shankar Tiwari, son of Harishankar Tiwari.

In the 2022 Uttar Pradesh Legislative Assembly election, Tripathi defeated the junior Tiwari as a Bharatiya Janata Party candidate from Chillupar.

References

1960s births
Living people
Uttar Pradesh MLAs 2022–2027
Bharatiya Janata Party politicians from Uttar Pradesh
Uttar Pradesh MLAs 2007–2012
Uttar Pradesh MLAs 2012–2017